Charles Minot may refer to:
 Charles Minot (railroad executive) (1810–1866), railroad executive at Erie Railroad
 Charles Minot Dole (1899–1976), founder of the National Ski Patrol
 Charles Sedgwick Minot (1852–1914), American anatomist and founding member of the American Society for Psychical Research